Åke Nilsson may refer to:
Åke Nilsson (canoeist) (1937–2005), Swedish sprint canoeist
Åke Nilsson (athlete) (born 1945), Swedish javelin thrower
Åke Nilsson (skier) (1927–1991), Swedish skier
Åke Nilsson (golfer), Swedish golfer 
Kjell-Åke Nilsson (born 1942), Swedish high jumper
Kjell-Åke Nilsson (footballer), Swedish association football forward
Sven-Åke Nilsson (born 1951), Swedish road racing cyclist